F. De Samara to A. G. A. is a poem by British author and poet Emily Jane Brontë, written on November 1, 1838.

Excerpt

Context

Historical context 
1838 was a year that saw the UK demand universal suffrage, and the beginning of the Central American Civil War. At the time of writing, Emily was two months into her new teaching job at Law Hill girls' school, in Halifax.

Gondal references 
The title of the poem makes reference to two characters from Emily's imaginary childhood island of Gondal, a place which she invented and wrote short stories about along with her younger sister Anne. Gondal was a kingdom ruled by the powerful Queen, Augusta Almeda, to whom the poem is written, from another character Fernando De Samara. Gondal was often at war with its rival nation Angria - another imaginary island and country, created by Emily and Anne's two siblings Branwell and Charlotte.

When read in this context F. De Samara to A. G. A. reveals Fernando de Samara's last words to his beloved Queen Augusta, as he commits suicide for her sake.

Poetic techniques

Linguistic techniques 
Suicide, as a theme, is evident also from the use of vivid imagery, as well as the heavy hearted tone conveyed through Emily's use of caesura and interjection.

Structural layout 
The poem uses thirteen stanzas, constructed using an ‘aabb’ rhyming structure. This is a conventional style of writing poetry, upon which Emily’s mark can be seen in the way certain lines lack the required rhyme. The effect of this technique is often to draw emphasis to the content of the line, and add impact to that stanza.

See also 
The Brontës
Poetry

Notes

External links 
Official Brontë website 
Wikisource - The works of Emily Brontë s:Author:Emily Brontë

Victorian poetry
Fantasy poetry
1838 poems
Poetry by Emily Brontë